The Christ Episcopal Church in  Cañon City, Colorado was built in 1902.  It was added to the National Register of Historic Places in 1994.

It is a T-shaped ashlar building consisting of a front-gabled, main section plus a gabled west wing, built in an L-shape in 1902, and a gabled east wing built in 1960.

References

Episcopal church buildings in Colorado
Churches on the National Register of Historic Places in Colorado
Churches completed in 1902
Buildings and structures in Fremont County, Colorado
Churches in Fremont County, Colorado
Buildings and structures in Cañon City, Colorado
National Register of Historic Places in Fremont County, Colorado